DHB Rotweiss Thun is a women's handball club from Thun in Switzerland. DHB Rotweiss Thun competes in the Spar Premium League.

Kits

European record

Team

Current squad 

Squad for the 2016–17 season

Goalkeepers
 Karmen Korenic
 Julia Kuslys 
 Sibylle Peronino

Wingers
RW
  Selina Jordi
  Adriana Lehmann
LW 
  Maura Noemi Feuz
  Annina Ganz
  Julia Hess
  Michelle Schmied
Line players 
  Fabiola Hostettler
  Helen Moser
  Gisele Andrea Angel Galaz

Back players
LB
  Teja Ferfolja
  Nina Lisa Gerber
  Tanja Marjanac
  Rebecca Wyer
CB 
  Jana Karlen
  Desiree Knecht 
  Celine Oberson 
  Kira Zumstein 
RB
  Laura Berger

External links

 
 

Swiss handball clubs
Thun